Wilkie was a provincial electoral district for the Legislative Assembly of the province of Saskatchewan, Canada, centered on the town of Wilkie, Saskatchewan. Created as "Tramping Lake" before the 3rd Saskatchewan general election in 1912, this constituency was renamed "Wilkie" in 1917.

This riding was arguably one of the most conservative in the province, having only once elected a member of the CCF or NDP – in the CCF's 1944 landslide victory.

The district was dissolved before the 23rd Saskatchewan general election in 1995. It is now part of the ridings of Biggar, Cut Knife-Turtleford, and Kindersley.

Members of the Legislative Assembly

Election results

|-

 
|Conservative
|Robert James Speers
|align="right"|878
|align="right"|44.01%
|align="right"|–
|- bgcolor="white"
!align="left" colspan=3|Total
!align="right"|1,995
!align="right"|100.00%
!align="right"|

|-

 
|Conservative
|Henry Oswald Wright
|align="right"|1,005
|align="right"|27.08%
|align="right"|-16.93

|- bgcolor="white"
!align="left" colspan=3|Total
!align="right"|3,711
!align="right"|100.00%
!align="right"|

|-

|- bgcolor="white"
!align="left" colspan=3|Total
!align="right"|3,289
!align="right"|100.00%
!align="right"|

|-

|- bgcolor="white"
!align="left" colspan=3|Total
!align="right"|3,273
!align="right"|100.00%
!align="right"|

|-
 
|style="width: 130px"|Conservative
|Alexander McLeod
|align="right"|2,814
|align="right"|51.07%
|align="right"|-

|- bgcolor="white"
!align="left" colspan=3|Total
!align="right"|5,510
!align="right"|100.00%
!align="right"|

|-

|Farmer-Labour
|George Joseph Hindley
|align="right"|2,011
|align="right"|26.33%
|align="right"|-
 
|Conservative
|Alexander McLeod
|align="right"|1,925
|align="right"|25.20%
|align="right"|-25.87
|- bgcolor="white"
!align="left" colspan=3|Total
!align="right"|7,638
!align="right"|100.00%
!align="right"|

|-

|- bgcolor="white"
!align="left" colspan=3|Total
!align="right"|6,850
!align="right"|100.00%
!align="right"|

|-
 
|style="width: 130px"|CCF
|Hans O. Hansen
|align="right"|3,567
|align="right"|58.53%
|align="right"|-

|- bgcolor="white"
!align="left" colspan=3|Total
!align="right"|6,094
!align="right"|100.00%
!align="right"|

|-

 
|CCF
|Hans O. Hansen
|align="right"|2,566
|align="right"|35.90%
|align="right"|-22.63

 
|Prog. Conservative
|O. Allan Bentley
|align="right"|329
|align="right"|4.60%
|align="right"|-
|- bgcolor="white"
!align="left" colspan=3|Total
!align="right"|7,148
!align="right"|100.00%
!align="right"|

|-

 
|CCF
|Hans O. Hansen
|align="right"|3,067
|align="right"|43.48%
|align="right"|+7.58

|- bgcolor="white"
!align="left" colspan=3|Total
!align="right"|7,054
!align="right"|100.00%
!align="right"|

|-

 
|CCF
|Samuel Onerheim
|align="right"|2,849
|align="right"|35.60%
|align="right"|-7.88

|- bgcolor="white"
!align="left" colspan=3|Total
!align="right"|8,003
!align="right"|100.00%
!align="right"|

|-

 
|CCF
|Lewis R. Thomas
|align="right"|2,315
|align="right"|30.23%
|align="right"|-5.37

 
|Prog. Conservative
|Walter O. Smith
|align="right"|660
|align="right"|8.62%
|align="right"|-
|- bgcolor="white"
!align="left" colspan=3|Total
!align="right"|7,658
!align="right"|100.00%
!align="right"|

|-

 
|CCF
|W. Ray Grant
|align="right"|2,162
|align="right"|29.20%
|align="right"|-1.03
 
|Prog. Conservative
|Donald Wallace
|align="right"|1,649
|align="right"|22.27%
|align="right"|+13.65
|- bgcolor="white"
!align="left" colspan=3|Total
!align="right"|7,404
!align="right"|100.00%
!align="right"|

|-

 
|NDP
|Norman Heather
|align="right"|2,436
|align="right"|38.96%
|align="right"|+9.76
|- bgcolor="white"
!align="left" colspan=3|Total
!align="right"|6,253
!align="right"|100.00%
!align="right"|

|-

 
|NDP
|Dick Scotton
|align="right"|3,140
|align="right"|48.69%
|align="right"|+9.73
|- bgcolor="white"
!align="left" colspan=3|Total
!align="right"|6,449
!align="right"|100.00%
!align="right"|

|-

 
|NDP
|Delaine Scotton
|align="right"|2,223
|align="right"|30.91%
|align="right"|-17.78
 
|Progressive Conservative
|Jim Garner
|align="right"|2,138
|align="right"|29.73%
|align="right"|-
|- bgcolor="white"
!align="left" colspan=3|Total
!align="right"|7,192
!align="right"|100.00%
!align="right"|

|-
 
|style="width: 130px"|Progressive Conservative
|Jim Garner
|align="right"|2,865
|align="right"|39.73%
|align="right"|+10.00
 
|NDP
|Ray Heather
|align="right"|2,371
|align="right"|32.88%
|align="right"|+1.97

|- bgcolor="white"
!align="left" colspan=3|Total
!align="right"|7,211
!align="right"|100.00%
!align="right"|

|-
 
|style="width: 130px"|Progressive Conservative
|Jim Garner
|align="right"|5,056
|align="right"|66.55%
|align="right"|+26.82
 
|NDP
|Wayne Birn
|align="right"|2,039
|align="right"|26.84%
|align="right"|-6.04

|- bgcolor="white"
!align="left" colspan=3|Total
!align="right"|7,597
!align="right"|100.00%
!align="right"|

|-
 
|style="width: 130px"|Progressive Conservative
|John Britton
|align="right"|3,457
|align="right"|48.35%
|align="right"|-18.20
 
|NDP
|Ted Zoller
|align="right"|2,151
|align="right"|30.09%
|align="right"|+3.25

|- bgcolor="white"
!align="left" colspan=3|Total
!align="right"|7,149
!align="right"|100.00%
!align="right"|

|-
 
|style="width: 130px"|Progressive Conservative
|John Britton
|align="right"|2,601
|align="right"|38.54%
|align="right"|-9.81
 
|NDP
|Sharon Murrell
|align="right"|2,295
|align="right"|34.00%
|align="right"|+3.91

|- bgcolor="white"
!align="left" colspan=3|Total
!align="right"|6,749
!align="right"|100.00%
!align="right"|

See also 
Electoral district (Canada)
List of Saskatchewan provincial electoral districts
List of Saskatchewan general elections
List of political parties in Saskatchewan
Rural Municipality of Tramping Lake No. 380
Wilkie, Saskatchewan

References 
 Saskatchewan Archives Board – Saskatchewan Election Results By Electoral Division

Former provincial electoral districts of Saskatchewan